Goods and Services Tax (GST) is a value-added tax or consumption tax for goods and services consumed in New Zealand.

GST in New Zealand is designed to be a broad-based system with few exemptions, such as for rents collected on residential rental properties, donations, precious metals and financial services. Because it is broad-based, it collects 31.4% of total taxation, making New Zealand the highest taxed country in the OECD in terms of sales tax as a proportion of GDP.

The rate for GST effective since 1 October 2010 is 15%. This 15% tax is applied to the final price of the product or service being purchased and goods and services are advertised as GST inclusive. 
Reduced rate GST (9%) applies to hotel accommodation on long term basis (longer than 4 weeks).
Zero rate GST (0%) applies to exports and related services; financial services; land transactions; international transportation.
Financial services, real estate, precious metals are exempt (0%)

Background
GST was introduced by the Fourth Labour Government of New Zealand on 1 October 1986 at a rate of 10% on most goods and services. It replaced existing sales taxes for some goods and services. GST was a part of the economic reforms initiated by Labour Finance Minister Roger Douglas dubbed Rogernomics. GST was introduced in conjunction with compensating changes to personal income tax rates and removal of many excise taxes on imported goods.

Since its introduction it has had two increases, on 1 July 1989 the rate increased to 12.5% and on 1 October 2010 it increased again to 15%.

How it works
GST-registered organisations and individuals pay GST only on the difference between GST-liable sales and GST-liable supplies (i.e., they pay GST on the difference between what they sell and what they buy: income less expenditure). This is accomplished by reconciling GST received (through sales) and GST paid (through purchases) at regular periods (typically every two months, with some qualifying companies opting for one-month or six-month periods), then either paying the difference to the Inland Revenue (IRD) if the GST collected on sales is higher or receiving a refund from IRD if the GST paid on purchases is higher.

Businesses exporting goods and services from New Zealand are entitled to "zero-rate" their products: effectively, they charge GST at 0%. This permits the business to claim back the input GST, but the eventual, non-New Zealand based consumer does not pay the tax (businesses that produce GST-exempt supplies are not able to claim back input GST).

Because businesses claim back their input GST, the GST inclusive price is usually irrelevant for business purchasing decisions, other than in relation to cash flow issues. Consequently, wholesalers often state prices exclusive of GST, but must collect the full, GST-inclusive price when they make the sale and account to the IRD for the GST so collected.

Digital services supplied by offshore companies 
On 1 October 2016, the taxation of digital ('remote') services supplied by offshore companies (non-New Zealand) to consumers based in New Zealand changed. Since that date, a GST of 15% (dubbed the 'Netflix Tax') is applied to all supplies from offshore digital service suppliers to New Zealand-based consumers. It is the supplier's responsibility to apply, collect and remit the new GST to New Zealand's Inland Revenue Department.

That new piece of GST legislation mirrors similar rules governing the supply of digital services introduced in the European Union (EU) in January 2015 on the taxation of digital goods.

The general taxation of digital goods and services has become more common internationally since the OECD released its long-awaited BEPS report in October 2015. Action 1 of the report deals with the taxation of the digital economy. The report provided guidelines and recommendations for such taxes be they in the form of value-added tax, GST, equalisation levy, or withholding tax.

New Zealand is the latest jurisdiction to include such rules in legislation following in the path of Norway, the EU, South Africa, South Korea, and Japan. In July 2017, the Australian government also plans to introduce similar rules.

See also
 Taxation in New Zealand
Goods and Services Tax (India)
Goods and Services Tax (Australia)
Goods and Services Tax (Canada)
Goods and Services Tax (Singapore)
Goods and Services Tax (Malaysia)

References

External links
Inland Revenue GST site
New Zealand Goods and Services Tax calculator
Treasury Taxation Overview

Taxation in New Zealand
New Zealand
1986 establishments in New Zealand